A referendum on trade union leadership was held in Venezuela on 3 December 2000. Voters were asked:

It was approved by 69.4% of voters, with a turnout of just 23.5%.

Results

References

2000 in Venezuela
2000 referendums
Referendums in Venezuela